Big Swing Face is a 1967 live album by the Buddy Rich Big Band. Its "The Beat Goes On" is a feature for Buddy Rich's daughter Cathy, whose vocal performance was overdubbed at United Recording in Hollywood. A reissue in 1996 doubles the listing with nine unreleased performances from the same engagement at the Chez Club in Hollywood.

Track listing
LP side A:
"Norwegian Wood (This Bird Has Flown)" (John Lennon, Paul McCartney) – 2:57
"Big Swing Face" (Bill Potts) – 5:15
"Monitor Theme" (Bernie Baum, Bill Giant, Florence Kaye) – 2:24
"Wack Wack" (Isaac "Redd" Holt, Donald Storball, Hysear Don Walker, Jimmy Young) – 3:04
"Love for Sale" (Cole Porter) – 4:30
LP side B:
"Mexicali Nose" (Harry Betts) – 2:49
"Willowcrest" (Bob Florence) – 4:55
"The Beat Goes On" (Sonny Bono) – 4:40
"Bugle Call Rag" (Billy Meyers, Jack Pettis, Elmer Schoebel) – 4:42
Bonus tracks on 1996 CD reissue:
"Standing Up in a Hammock" (Potts) – 2:32
"Chicago" (Fred Fisher) – 2:47
"Lament for Lester" (Jay Corre) – 2:30
"Machine" (Bill Reddie) – 3:45
"Silver Threads Among the Blues" (Don Piestrup) – 4:40
"New Blues" (Piestrup) – 4:38
"Old Timey" (Bob Florence) – 3:25
"Loose" (Bill Holman) – 4:05
"Apples (aka Gino)" (Arthur M. Wiggins) – 2:35

Personnel

Musicians
Quinn Davis – alto saxophone
Ernie Watts – alto saxophone and flute
Jay Corre, Robert Keller – tenor saxophone and flute
Marty Flax – baritone saxophone
Bobby Shew, Yoshito Murakami, Charles Findley, John Scottile – trumpet
Jim Trimble, John Boice – trombone
Bill Wimberly – bass trombone
Richie Resnicoff – guitar
Ray Starling – piano
James Gannon – double bass
Buddy Rich – drums
 Cathy Rich – vocals
Shorty Rogers – arranger: "Wack, Wack" and "The Beat Goes On"

References

Buddy Rich live albums
1967 live albums
Pacific Jazz Records live albums